Arnhem Zuid is a railway station located in southern Arnhem, Netherlands. The station was opened on 11 December 2005 and is located on the Arnhem - Nijmegen railway line. The station is operated by Nederlandse Spoorwegen.

Train services

Bus services

Gallery

Other Stations in Arnhem
Arnhem
Arnhem Presikhaaf railway station
Arnhem Velperpoort

External links
NS website 
Dutch Public Transport journey planner 

Zuid
Railway stations opened in 2005
Railway stations on the Arnhem - Nijmegen railway line
2005 establishments in the Netherlands
Railway stations in the Netherlands opened in the 21st century